The Tianjin Juilliard School is a branch of the Juilliard School located in Binhai, Tianjin, China. It is the first institution in China which offers a U.S.-accredited Master of Music degree.

History 
The school was to be managed by Juilliard.

On September 28, 2015 during a trip from the First Lady of China Peng Liyuan, the dean of the Juilliard School, Joseph W. Polisi, announced that the school will build a research institute in Tianjin in 2018. In July 2016, the architectural design plan of the Tianjin Juilliard School was finalized by Diller Scofidio + Renfro. The Tianjin Juilliard School site project started construction on February 28, 2017. Due to many delays including the National Games of China, multiple construction projects in the area, as well as the COVID-19 pandemic, construction was finally completed in October 2020. The complex includes a 690-seat concert hall, a 299-seat recital hall, and a 225-seat black-box theater. 

After a year of the pre-college division operating from the Tianjin Conservatory, the Tianjin Juilliard School started operating in the fall of 2020 with its first class of 39 students from 11 countries. On October 26, 2021, the Tianjin Juilliard School held a campus inauguration ceremony of its landmark campus with Peng Liyuan expressing her continued support. On May 20, 2022, the first class graduated from the school.

Programs

Graduate Studies 
The Graduate Studies program offers Masters of Music degrees in orchestral studies, chamber music, and collaborative piano. Pre-formed groups for the chamber music program have the chance to take part in the Tianjin Juilliard Chamber Music Fellowship Program which features professional and personal benefits including financial rewards and performance opportunities in China and New York.

Pre-College 
The Pre-College division opened in 2019 while based in the Tianjin Conservatory and is made for students aged 8-18. Classes take place from 8:30am to 6:00pm on Saturdays during the school year which includes core classes of private lessons, chamber music, ear training, music theory, chorus, and English for music, major-specific courses including orchestra, studio class, and courses specific to pianists, composers, percussionists, and reed instrumentalists, and elective courses including lessons on a secondary instrument, conducting, and group composition.

Other 
The school also provides public education and continuing education programs. The Public Education Program consists of the Music Development Program meant for serious students and Music Discovery which serves as an introductory course. The Continuing Education program consists of English for Professional Musicianship and the Professional Development Program which is centered around pedagogy.

Notable people

Teachers

References

External links 

 Official website

Juilliard School
2019 establishments in China
Music schools in China
Educational institutions established in 2019
Universities and colleges in Tianjin